is a passenger railway station located in the city of Honjō, Saitama, Japan, operated by the East Japan Railway Company (JR East).

Lines

Layout
The station has one side platform and one island platform serving three tracks, connected by a footbridge, with an elevated station building located above the platforms. The station has a "Midori no Madoguchi" staffed ticket office.

Platforms

History 
Honjō Station was opened on 21 October 1883. The station became part of the JR East network after the privatization of the JNR on 1 April 1987.

Passenger statistics 
In fiscal 2019, the station was used by an average of 9853 passengers daily (boarding passengers only).

Surrounding area
Honjō City Hall
Honjō Post Office

See also
List of railway stations in Japan

References

External links

JR East station information 

Railway stations in Saitama Prefecture
Railway stations in Japan opened in 1883
Takasaki Line
Shōnan-Shinjuku Line
Stations of East Japan Railway Company
Honjō, Saitama